A total of 85 people were executed under New Zealand's capital punishment system while it was in force. An additional five New Zealand soldiers were executed under military regulations in France during World War I, though they subsequently received posthumous pardons under the Pardon for Soldiers of the Great War Act 2000.

List of executed persons

Military executions
In addition to those executed under New Zealand's regular criminal justice system, five New Zealand soldiers fighting as part of the Allied war effort in World War I were court-martialed and subsequently executed by firing squad.

The executions were not made public at the time. All five were pardoned in 2000 when New Zealand Parliament concluded that their convictions had been unjust, and that today, all would be regarded as mentally unfit to serve. Two of them (King and Sweeney) were born in Australia.

Number of executions by location
Initially, executions were carried out in public, and could be conducted at any suitable location – in at least one case (Joseph Burns, 1848) the prisoner was taken to the scene of the crime for execution. Executions from 1862 were carried out in private. Later, the number of locations was reduced to only two – Auckland (generally Mount Eden Prison) and Wellington (generally Mount Crawford Prison). In total, ten cities were the sites of executions.

References

External links
New Zealand History Online - List of executions
Helen's Page of New Zealand History - Executed in New Zealand
The execution of the Maungatapu Murderers
The murder of Mary Dobie by Tutiaha in 1880
Murders on Crime.co

Law enforcement in New Zealand
Executions